The 2008 Cheltenham Gold Cup was a horse race which took place at Cheltenham on Friday 14 March 2008. It was the 80th running of the Cheltenham Gold Cup, and it was won by Denman. The winner was ridden by Sam Thomas, and the first three horses were all trained by Paul Nicholls. The odds-on favourite Kauto Star finished second and Neptune Collonges was a close third.

The race had been billed as the most anticipated Gold Cup since Arkle and Mill House clashed in 1964, with Kauto Star racing against Denman for the first time. However, a close contest failed to materialise as Denman defeated his rival by a comfortable margin.

Race details
 Sponsor: Totesport
 Winner's prize money: £268,279.10
 Going: Good to Soft
 Number of runners: 12
 Winner's time: 6m 47.84s

Full result

* The distances between the horses are shown in lengths or shorter. shd = short-head; PU = pulled-up.† Trainers are based in Great Britain unless indicated.

Winner's details
Further details of the winner, Denman:

 Foaled: 17 April 2000 in Ireland
 Sire: Presenting; Dam: Polly Puttens (Pollerton)
 Owner: Paul Barber and Margaret Findlay
 Breeder: Colman O'Flynn

References
 
 sportinglife.com
 guardian.co.uk – "Denman claims Gold Cup victory" – March 14, 2008.

Cheltenham Gold Cup
 2008
Cheltenham Gold Cup
Cheltenham Gold Cup
2000s in Gloucestershire